Elliptio ahenea is a species of bivalve in the family Unionidae. It is endemic to the United States.

References

Molluscs of the United States
ahenea
Bivalves described in 1843
Taxonomy articles created by Polbot